Capitites albicans is a species of tephritid or fruit flies in the genus Capitites of the family Tephritidae.

Distribution
South Africa.

References

Tephritinae
Insects described in 1935
Diptera of Africa